Tin Mountain is an  summit in the Panamint Range in northern Death Valley National Park, California, located north of Teakettle Junction.

See also
List of mountain peaks of California

References

Mountains of Inyo County, California
Mountains of Death Valley National Park
North American 2000 m summits